The Prague Manifesto is a document that establishes a set of seven widely shared principles of the Esperanto movement. It was drafted at the 1996 World Esperanto Congress in Prague by officials from the United Nations Educational, Scientific and Cultural Organization (UNESCO) and those attending the congress. The document emphasizes democratic communication, language rights, preservation of language diversity, and effective language education.

Text
The following is the full English text of the 15-page pamphlet, which includes the same text in French, Spanish, Russian, Chinese and Arabic. (The pamphlet, published by Universal Esperanto Association, is undated).

We, members of the worldwide movement for the promotion of Esperanto, address this manifesto to all governments, international organizations and people of good will; declare our unshakable commitment to the objectives set out here; and invite each and every organization and individual to join us in our effort.

Launched in 1887 as a project for an auxiliary language for international communication and quickly developed into a rich living language in its own right, Esperanto has worked for more than a century to connect people across language and culture barriers. Meanwhile, the objectives of its speakers have not lost importance or relevance. Neither the worldwide use of a few national languages, nor advances in communications technology, nor the development of new methods of language instruction will likely realize the following principles, which we consider essential for just and effective language order.

1. Democracy
A communication system which privileges some people but requires of others that they invest years of effort in order to attain a lesser degree of competency is fundamentally undemocratic. Although, like any language, Esperanto is not perfect, it greatly exceeds all rivals in the sphere of equitable global communication.

We assert that language inequality entails inequality of communication at all levels, including the international level. We are a movement for democratic communication.

2. Transnational Education
Any ethnic language is linked to a certain culture and nation or group of nations. For example, the student who studies English learns about the culture, geography and politics of the English-speaking world, primary the United States and United Kingdom. The student who studies Esperanto learns about a world without limits, in which every country is like a home.

We assert that the education of any ethnic language is linked to a specific worldview. We are a movement for transnational education.

3. Pedagogical Efficiency
Only a small percentage of those who study a foreign language begin to master it. Full understanding of Esperanto is achievable within a month of study. Various studies have ascribed propaedeutic effects to the study of other languages. One also recommends Esperanto as a core element in courses for the linguistic sensitization of students.

We assert that the difficulty of the ethnic languages always will present obstacles to many students, who nevertheless would profit from the knowledge of a second language. We are a movement for effective language instruction.

4. Multilingualism
The Esperanto community is one of the few worldwide linguistic communities whose members are, without exception, bi- or multilingual. Each member of the community accepted the task of learning at least one foreign language to a communicative degree.  In multiple cases this leads to the knowledge and love of several languages and generally to broader personal horizons.

We assert that the speakers of all languages, large and small, should have a real opportunity to learn a second language to a high communicative level. We are a movement for the provision of that opportunity.

5. Linguistic Rights
The unequal distribution of power between languages is a recipe for permanent language insecurity, or straightforward linguistic suppression, in a large part of the world's population. In the Esperanto community, the speakers of a language, large or small, official or nonofficial, meet on neutral terms, thanks to a reciprocated will to compromise. This equilibrium between linguistic rights and responsibilities provides a precedent for developing and evaluating other solutions to language inequalities and conflict.

We assert that the vast variations in power among languages undermines the guarantees, expressed in so many international documents, of equal treatment without discrimination of languages. We are a movement for linguistic rights.

6. Linguistic Diversity
The national governments tend to consider the grand diversification of world languages as barriers to communication and development. For the Esperanto community, however, linguistic diversity is a constant and indispensable source of enrichment. Therefore, every language, like every living thing, is inherently valuable and worthy of protection and support.

We assert that policies of communication and development, if not based on respect and support for all languages, condemn to extinction the majority of the word's languages. We are a movement for linguistic diversity.

7. Human Emancipation
Every language liberates and imprisons its speakers, giving to them the power to communicate among themselves while barring them from communication with others. Planned as a universal communications tool, Esperanto is one of the largest functioning projects of human emancipation or projects to enable every human to participate as an individual in the human community, with secure roots in their local culture and linguistic identity, while not being limited by it.

We assert that the exclusive use of national languages inevitably raises barriers to the freedoms of expression, communication, and association. We are a movement for human emancipation.

References

External links
 Manifesto of Prague (Manifesto de Prago pri la internacia lingvo Esperanto)

Esperanto history
1996 documents
Esperanto in the Czech Republic